The 2022 Football West season is the ninth season since the establishment of the National Premier Leagues in Western Australia.

Pre-season changes
In February 2022, ECU Joondalup SC and Northern Redbacks SC announced a merger to create Perth RedStar FC as a new club.

League tables

2022 National Premier Leagues WA 
The competition is being held as a double round-robin played over 22 rounds, scheduled to be completed on 27 August, followed by an end of season Top 4 Cup competition.

Top four cup

2022 WA State League 1

State League finals series

Inter-divisional promotion/relegation play-offs

2022 WA State League 2

2022 NPL Women 

The 2022 NPL WA Women was the third season in the National Premier Leagues WA Women format. It was played over 21 rounds as a triple round-robin, followed by an end of season Top 4 Cup competition.

Top four cup

2022 State Cup 

Western Australian soccer clubs competed in the Football West State Cup competition, which initially involved teams from the Amateur League and Metropolitan League competitions, and from regional teams from the South West and Great Southern regions. In the third round, teams from the two divisions of the State League entered, and in the fourth round teams from the National Premier Leagues WA entered.

The competition also served as the Western Australian Preliminary rounds for the 2022 Australia Cup. The two finalists – Armadale SC and Cockburn City – qualified for the final rounds, entering at the Round of 32.

The final was played on 24 July, and won by Cockburn City, their seventh title (five of the first six having been won by the predecessor club Spearwood Dalmatinac).

References

External links
Football West Official website

Soccer in Western Australia
Football West
2022